Station Zero is an American daily adult animated series that aired on MTV for one season in 1999, airing Monday through Friday at 6:30 pm. The show followed a group of four Bronx teenagers who ran a fictional public-access television show called Live from the Bronx, where they watched hip hop videos and critiqued them in a similar manner as that of Beavis and Butt-head. It was based on A View From Da' Unda'Ground, a comic strip from the same team which ran in The Source from 1991 to 1994.

Characters
Chino: A 17-year-old Latino kid, who is the host of the show, the MC and the hip-hop purist and re-represents the underground such as Rakim and KRS-One. His catchphrase is "Oh man!", "Wha-what!", "Aw, come on, man!".
Karaz: A 18-year-old African-American kid, who is very shy and timid, He is the co-host of the show and the pop-loving “hustler/ politician”. He is really get into the mainstream hip-hop such as Diddy and Jay-Z. His catchphrase is "Don't talk about my mom".
DJ Tech: A 18-year-old silent DJ, who speaks with his cuts using the turntables.
Scooter: A 14-year-old black kid, who is Karaz's best friend and the self-proclaimed director and producer of the show. He's the smartest and intelligent kid in the Bronx. His catchphrase is "We're on the air here."
The Man: He is the unseen character. His signature scare chord plays after the teenagers says "The Man".

Episodes

Broadcast
In the United Kingdom, the show aired on MTV Base in 1999, being among the first shows to air on the newly created network.

Reception
The show was eventually canceled after only one season of twenty episodes. While it was primarily canceled for its lower ratings, it's speculated that it was because the producers and writers knew of this show's quick demise because of low ratings, and the animated cast walks off into the sunset in the finale.

References

External links

 
 
 Station Zero at TV Guide

1990s American adult animated television series
1990s American black cartoons
1990s American daily animated television series
1990s American musical comedy television series
1999 American television series debuts
1999 American television series endings
American adult animated comedy television series
American adult animated musical television series
English-language television shows
MTV cartoons
MTV original programming
MTV weekday shows
Teen animated television series
American television series with live action and animation
Hip hop television
Television shows set in the Bronx
Animated television series about brothers